Capraita circumdata is a species of flea beetle in the family Chrysomelidae. It is endemic to North America.

References

Further reading

 
 

Alticini
Articles created by Qbugbot
Beetles described in 1838
Taxa named by John Witt Randall